Third Album is the third studio album released by the Jackson 5 on Motown Records, and the group's second LP released in 1970, on September 18.

Third Album featured the group's fourth consecutive No. 1 single on the US pop charts, "I'll Be There", the Top 5 single "Mama's Pearl", and album tracks such as the semi-autobiographical "Goin' Back to Indiana" and "Darling Dear". The album peaked at No. 4 on the Billboard Top LPs chart and No. 1 on both the US R&B Albums chart and on Cashbox. The release is considered one of the group's best efforts. It sold over 6 million copies worldwide.

Reception

Allmusic's Lindsay Planer rated Third Album four out of five stars. She stated that the album contains "the unmistakable Motown sound, expanding just enough to incorporate other significant influences as well." She also stated that a few of the tracks "are [...] worthwhile spins."

Track listing

Side one
"I'll Be There" (Berry Gordy, Jr., Bob West, Hal Davis, Willie Hutch) – 3:59
Lead vocals: Michael Jackson and Jermaine Jackson
Background vocals: The Jackson 5
"Ready or Not Here I Come (Can't Hide from Love)" (Thom Bell, William Hart; originally performed by The Delfonics) – 2:34
Lead vocals: Michael Jackson
"Oh How Happy" (Edwin Starr aka Charles Hatcher; originally performed by the Shades of Blue) – 2:16
Lead vocals: Jermaine Jackson
Secondary vocals: Michael Jackson
"Bridge Over Troubled Water" (Paul Simon; originally performed by Simon & Garfunkel) – 5:52
Lead vocals: Jermaine Jackson
"Can I See You in the Morning" (Deke Richards) – 3:09
Lead vocals: Michael Jackson

Side two
"Goin' Back to Indiana" (The Corporation) – 3:32
Lead vocals: Michael Jackson
Spoken vocals: The Jackson 5
"How Funky Is Your Chicken" (Lester Lee Carr, Richard Hutch, Willie Hutch) – 2:41
Lead vocals: Michael Jackson, Jermaine Jackson, Jackie Jackson
"Mama's Pearl" (The Corporation) – 3:09
Lead vocals: Michael Jackson
Secondary vocals: Jermaine Jackson, Jackie Jackson
"Reach In" (Beatrice Verdi) – 3:28
Lead vocals: Jermaine Jackson, Michael Jackson
"The Love I Saw In You Was Just a Mirage" (Smokey Robinson, Marv Tarplin; originally performed by the Miracles) – 4:22
Lead and spoken vocals: Michael Jackson
"Darling Dear" (George Horgay Gordy, Robert Gordy, Allen Story) – 2:40
Lead vocals: Michael Jackson

Re-release
In 2001, Motown Records remastered all J5 albums in a "Two Classic Albums/One CD" series (much like they did in the late 1980s). This album was paired up with Maybe Tomorrow. The bonus tracks were "Sugar Daddy", the only new track on their 1971 greatest hits set, and "I'm So Happy", the B-side of that single.

Charts

See also
List of number-one R&B albums of 1970 (U.S.)

References

External links
  Third Album overview at www.jackson5abc.com

1970 albums
The Jackson 5 albums
Motown albums
Albums produced by Hal Davis
Albums produced by the Corporation (record production team)